Kalanchoe daigremontiana, formerly known as Bryophyllum daigremontianum and commonly called mother of thousands,  or Mexican hat plant, is a succulent plant native to Madagascar. Like other members of Bryophyllum (now included in the genus Kalanchoe), it can propagate vegetatively from plantlets that develop on its leaf margins, as well as through upshoots from lateral roots, and seeds. All parts of this species contain a very toxic steroid known as daigremontianin.

It is often confused with K. laetivirens, K. delagoensis and K. × houghtonii. The leaves of K. laetivirens are completely green, while K. daigremontiana has bands or spots on the back of leaves. The leaves of K. delagoensis are linear, while K. daigremontiana has lanceolate, oblong, ovate or triangular leaves. K. × houghtonii is a hybrid between K. daigremontiana and K. delagoensis, therefore has characteristics in between; its leaves are narrower than those of K. daigremontiana, and its leaf base is attenuate, cuneate to weakly cordate or auriculate, while K. daigremontiana has strongly cordate to auriculate or even peltate leaves.

Morphology 
They are green above and blotched with purple underneath. Leaf margins have spoon-shaped bulbiliferous spurs which bear plantlets which may form roots while still attached to leaves.

A plant's upper leaves may grow large, causing its main stalk to bend downward. Then the lateral roots may enter soil and new vertical shoots may grow from the original shoot. Kalanchoe daigremontiana can spread by both seeds and by plantlets dropped from its leaves.

Kalanchoe daigremontiana has an umbrella-like terminal inflorescence (a compound cyme) of small bell-shaped, grayish pink (or sometimes orange) flowers. Flowering is, however, not an annual event and occurs sporadically if at all on some shoots. Particularly in climates with distinct seasonal temperature differences, flowering is most frequently observed at the beginning of a warm season. Indoor plants, as well as balcony plants which have been moved inside to survive the cold season, begin flowering in early winter.

As a succulent plant, K. daigremontiana can survive prolonged periods of drought with little or no water. During growth periods with higher temperatures and increased water supply, this species requires proper nutrition, without which leaves show deficiency symptoms such as crippled growth and pustule-like lesions. The plant is not frost-hardy and typically dies in places where temperatures are below freezing.

Physiology 

Plants of the genus Kalanchoe as well as many other plants growing in arid regions photosynthesize via Crassulacean acid metabolism.

Distribution 
Kalanchoe daigremontiana is native to the Fiherenana River valley and Androhibolava mountains in southwest Madagascar. It has been introduced to numerous tropical and subtropical regions, such as Florida, Puerto Rico, Hawaii, Venezuela, Argentina, Brazil, Uruguay, and parts of southern Europe.

Habitat 
Kalanchoe daigremontiana prefers to grow in rocky and dry places.

It can become an invasive plant and threaten natural ecosystems, especially in arid and semi-arid environments (South Africa and regions of South America for example), where it can inhibit native-plant recruitment.

Gallery

References

Further reading

External links

Photos of Kalanchoe daigremontiana inflorescences
United States Department of Agriculture profile on Kalanchoe daigremontiana
plantoftheweek.com entry on Kalanchoe daigremontiana
Poisonous houseplants entry on Kalanchoe daigremontiana

daigremontiana
daigremontianum
House plants
Plants described in 1914
Taxa named by Joseph Marie Henry Alfred Perrier de la Bâthie